The Navy Midshipmen men's soccer team represents the United States Naval Academy in National Collegiate Athletic Association (NCAA) Division I men's soccer. Navy competes as a member of the Patriot League. It used to play its home games at Navy–Marine Corps Memorial Stadium, but now plays them at Glenn Warner Soccer Facility.

History
The team began play in 1921 and has competed for the NCAA Men's Division I Soccer Championship since the tournament began in 1959. Since 1921, the Midshipmen have acquired a total of 595 wins, 330 losses, and 119 draws.

Pre-NCAA
Before the NCAA began its tournament in 1959, the Intercollegiate Soccer Football Association (ISFA) declared the annual national champion, from 1927 to 1958. Navy was national co-champion in 1932, with the University of Pennsylvania.

The Glenn Warner years
What are considered the golden years of Navy Soccer lasted under the tenure of Coach Glenn Warner, who acted as head coach of the squad for 30 years. In those 30 years, Coach Warner guided the Midshipmen to nine NCAA Tournament appearances, four Final Four appearances, one national championship, 28 winning seasons and a record of 243–65–31.

The six most successful years of Navy Soccer took place between 1962 and 1967, wherein the team qualified six consecutive times for the NCAA Tournament. In 1962, the squad was eliminated in the first round, only to improve the next year to second place, after losing to St. Louis, 3–0, in the final. In 1964, however, they captured the championship, this time beating Michigan State in the final match, 1–0. This would mark the only NCAA Soccer Title in the Academy's history.

In 1965, the squad fell to fourth place in the tournament and were knocked out in the quarterfinals, the following year. They again achieved third place in 1966, after losing to St. Louis, 1–0, in the semi-final. The Mids would return to the Tournament three more times with Glenn Warner, but would never come close to recapturing the title.  After Glenn Warner's resignation, the Academy qualified for the Tournament in 1988, this being the only time the squad would qualify for the finals without Glenn Warner as coach.

The Patriot League
Since the initiation of the Patriot League's soccer program in 1990, Navy has reached the final match three times: 1995, 1996, and 1999.

The Academy's athletic department completed the construction of $4.5 million soccer facility. The  facility is named after Navy's legendary Men's coach, Glenn Warner.

In 2018, Jacob Williams was only the second Midshipman to gain the Patriot League 'Rookie of the Year' honor.  Williams notched 8 goals in his first season with the program.

Anders Hall of Honor
The Anders Hall of Honor — located in the Glenn Warner Soccer Facility — contains thirteen trophy cases and display areas that honor past soccer-team members who have distinguished themselves in soccer, the military, or civilian life.

The hall was given its name to commemorate retired Maj. General William A. Anders and family, who helped finance it.

Athletic Hall of Fame
The Athletic Hall of Fame is located in Lejeune Hall. For soccer players in the USNA Athletic Hall of Fame, see footnote

Glenn Warner Soccer Facility

Statistics

NCAA Division I Championship Tournament

Patriot League Tournament

Intercollegiate Soccer Football Association
1932: National Champion (with University of Pennsylvania)

See also
 1944 Navy Midshipmen men's soccer team
 1964 Navy Midshipmen men's soccer team
 Army–Navy Cup, the annual rivalry match against the Army Black Knights men's soccer program

Footnotes

External links
 
 USNA Athletics official webpage (including club sports)

 
1921 establishments in Maryland
Association football clubs established in 1921
Military soccer clubs in the United States